Lancelot Pease Clark (30 April 1936 – 27 February 2018), was an English shoemaker, businessman, and member of the Clark family, which is the majority owner of shoe retailer Clarks.

Career 
Clark was born in Street, Somerset into the sixth generation of the Clarks shoemaking family.

He was educated at Leighton Park School and New College, Oxford. While working in the family business, he was managing director of Clarks UK, prior to the business being placed under non-family management. He is credited with the creation of the Wallabee shoe in 1965. After retiring from Clarks, Clark went on to work with the Edward Green and Terra Plana shoe brands.

As of 2017, the Clark family still owned more than 80 per cent of the company, according to The Sunday Times. Lancelot Clark's branch of the family collectively owned about 25 per cent.

In 2008, Clark set up ethical footwear brand Soul of Africa, which raises money for South African orphans who have lost their parents to AIDS.

Personal life 
Based in Street, Somerset for much of his life, Clark was a painter. He had seven children in total, four in his first marriage: Galahad, Odette, Conrad and Tony, as well as three in his second: Yoyi, Yomei and Fiona.

References 

1936 births
2018 deaths
20th-century English businesspeople
People from Street, Somerset